Sir Hugh Dow  (8 May 1886 – 20 November 1978) was an Indian civil servant during the British Raj. He served as the Governor of Sindh. The Dow Medical College is named after him.

Career
Dow entered the Indian Civil Service in 1909 and served in various senior administrative and advisory capacities in pre-war India. From 1939 to 1941, he was Director-General of Supply and President of the War Supply Board, India; and from 1941 to 1946, Governor of Sind. He became Governor of Bihar in 1946. He was appointed a CIE in 1932, a CSI in 1937, knighted with the KCSI in 1940 and appointed a GCIE in 1947.

Sindh
Dow served as the second Governor of Sindh from 1 April 1941 to 14 January 1946 succeeding Sir Lancelot Graham. He laid the foundation stone of Dow Medical College, now a constituent college of the Dow University of Health Sciences, Karachi in December 1945. The Muslim League stated that Hindu mobs had killed 30,000 people in the province.[12] A resolution stated that Hugh Dow, the governor of Bihar and the Indian National Congress were responsible for the massacre. Historians such as Suranjan Das have referred to the Great Calcutta Killings of 1946 as the first explicitly political communal violence in the region.[3]

Later career
After leaving India he was Consul-General, Jerusalem, and then Chairman of the East Africa Royal Commission.

Personal life

Sir Hugh Dow did brilliantly at school and was awarded scholarships which funded his studies. As he did not come from an elite family, he was sometimes looked down on by those who did. Although his father became a Methodist Christian minister around the age of forty he was not at all interested in any kind of church. He set himself extremely high standards in all aspects of his life and was described as very kind, gentle and generous, but not out-going and rather serious by his granddaughter in a letter to the Dow College.

He had married Annie Sheffield. He and his wife refused to use rickshaws because they thought it was degrading for the men. Instead, they walked and had shelters built for the rickshaw men so that they had a place to sleep and to get out of the rain. Annie was appointed a CBE in 1948 for welfare work.

Annie Sheffield died of cancer in 1956, after that Sir Hugh never married again or had another woman, spending 22 years as a widower in his central London Flat.

They had a son Hugh Peter and a daughter Dorothea Dow, who married an Australian doctor and spent the rest of her life in Wollongong, New South Wales, Australia.

He died in his sleep in November 1978 in London. Dying at 92 years of age, he was still fit and died without a state of illness going ahead. He did daily physical exercises until he was 85 years old.

References

Letter from his granddaughter http://www.thedowdays.com/wp/2017/12/12/the-letter-from-the-grand-daughter-of-sir-hugh-dow/

Indian Civil Service (British India) officers
Governors of Sindh
Knights Grand Commander of the Order of the Indian Empire
Knights Commander of the Order of the Star of India
1886 births
1978 deaths
Consuls-General of the United Kingdom to Jerusalem